Poian is a commune in Covasna County, Transylvania, Romania composed of two villages:
Belani / Bélafalva
Poian / Kézdiszentkereszt

History 

It formed part of the Székely Land region of the historical Transylvania province. Until 1918, the village belonged to the Háromszék County of the Kingdom of Hungary. After the Treaty of Trianon of 1920, it became part of Romania. In 2005, Estelnic, along with two other villages, broke away from Poian to form an independent commune.

Demographics

The commune has an absolute Székely Hungarian majority. According to the 2002 census, it has a population of 1,765 of which 99.43% or 1,755 are Hungarian.

References

Communes in Covasna County
Localities in Transylvania